Acheilognathus hondae also known as Seoho bitterling is a species of freshwater ray-finned fish in the genus Acheilognathus.  It is endemic to South Korea.

Named in honor of K. Honda, director, Agricultural Station at Suigen (Korea), “who obtained for us a fine collection from the pond at this station”.

References

Acheilognathus
Taxa named by David Starr Jordan
Fish described in 1913
Fish of East Asia